The Ohio Legislative Black Caucus (OLBC), formally known as the Black Elected Democrats of Ohio, is an American political organization now composed of African Americans elected to the Ohio General Assembly. The Ohio Legislative Black Caucus is the oldest legislative black caucus in the nation.

Purpose
The purpose for establishing OLBC was to recognize and address the hopes, aspirations and needs of African Americans in Ohio. The organization continues to help ensure equality for all citizens by promoting, fostering and sponsoring educational, civic and political initiatives. Its primary focus is public policy advocacy and development, as well as, significant involvement in state and national electoral politics.

History
The first African-American man elected to the Ohio House of Representatives was George Washington Williams in 1880, followed by John Patterson Green's election to the Ohio Senate in 1892. Unlike in many parts of the United States, African-Americans in the Ohio House of Representatives have had one of the longest-running presences in any state legislature in the United States, being present in the House in every decade with a few interruptions since 1880; the Illinois House of Representatives has had the longest uninterrupted streak of African-American members since 1882.

The Ohio Legislative Black Caucus was founded in 1967 by African American state legislators under the leadership of State Representative C.J. McLin of Dayton, Ohio. At that time, the organization was known as BEDO (Black Elected Democrats of Ohio). Along with McLin, Rep. William Mallory, Rep. Bill Bowen, Rep. Phale Hale, Rep. Thomas Hill, Sen. Morris Jackson, Rep. Troy Lee James, and Rep. Larry Smith also helped establish the organization. The organization's structure and purpose was subsequently duplicated in at least 32 other states in the following years.

Since its establishment, the OLBC has been joined by African-American women, starting with Helen Rankin in 1978 in the House and Rhine McLin in 1994 in the Ohio Senate.

Mission and vision
The Ohio Legislative Black Caucus seeks to promote, foster, and sponsor education, civic, and political activities that enrich and improve African American communities across the state of Ohio through the efforts of the members of Ohio Legislative Black Caucus. This is further accomplished through active legislation in the statehouse and community partnerships with other elected officials and constituents in and around the districts we represent.

Over the past 50 years, the members of the Ohio Legislative Black Caucus have been on the front-lines, fully committed to fighting for issues important to African Americans in Ohio. The caucus is dedicated to reforming the criminal justice system, ensuring the fundamental right to vote is not infringed upon, securing a fair playing field for African Americans seeking good-paying jobs, addressing health disparities, combating poverty, and strengthening the education system to help ensure a bright future for the next generation of African American/ black leaders here in Ohio. Furthermore, we strive to always be a voice and conscious in the legislature not just for Black Ohioans but all minorities in Ohio, while cultivating a culture that will create strong leadership in the black community and all Ohio in the years to come.

Current membership
List of officers:

Non-officer members
Ohio House of Representatives Minority Leader Emilia Sykes (D-Dayton)
Ohio House of Representatives Minority Whip Paula Hicks-Hudson (D-Toledo)
Ohio House of Representatives Caucus Chairman Phil Robinson (D-Solon)
Ohio State Senate Assistant Minority Leader Cecil Thomas (D-Cincinnati)
Ohio State Senate Assistant Minority Whip Tina Maharath (D-Columbus)
Ohio State Rep. Willis Blackshear (D-Dayton)
Ohio State Rep. Janine Boyd (D-Cleveland Heights)
Ohio State Rep. Erica Crawley (D-Columbus)
Ohio State Rep. Tavia Galonski (D-Akron)
Ohio State Rep. Stephanie Howse (D-Cleveland)
Ohio State Rep. Dontavius Jarrells (D-Colubmus)
Ohio State Sen. Sandra Williams (D-Cleveland)

References

www.ohiolegislativeblackcaucus.org

External links
 Ohio Legislative Black Caucus website
 Ohio Legislative Black Caucus Foundation website

Ohio General Assembly
State Legislative Black Caucuses
1967 establishments in Ohio